In the politics of the European Union, an Intergovernmental Conference (IGC) is the formal procedure for negotiating amendments to the EU's founding treaties. Under the treaties, an IGC is called into being by the European Council, and is composed of representatives of the member states, with the Commission, and to a lesser degree the Parliament also participating.

An IGC will conclude with a meeting of the European Council, at which any political issues requiring resolution at the level of Heads of State or Government will be resolved, and final political agreement will be reached. A final treaty text in each of the community languages will then be prepared by the legal and linguistic experts of the member states, before being presented to the member states for signature and ratification.

List of International Governmental Conferences  
 The Intergovernmental Conference on the EMU of 1991 
 The Intergovernmental Conference on the Political Union of 1991 
 Intergovernmental Conference on the Common Market and Euratom of 1956.
 Intergovernmental Conference on the Constitutional Treaty of 1966
 Intergovernmental Conference on the Constitutional Treaty of 2004
 Intergovernmental Conference on the Lisbon Treaty of 2007

See also

References

 Conference on the Future of Europe
 Convention on the Future of Europe
 Convention to propose amendments to the United States Constitution
 European Assizes
 European Convention (disambiguation)
 Intergovernmental Conference on the Common Market and Euratom of 1956.
 Sherpa (G8)
 Spaak method

Treaties of the European Union